The 59th General Assembly of Prince Edward Island was in session from June 7, 1993, to October 21, 1996. The Liberal Party led by Catherine Callbeck formed the government. After Callbeck's resignation, Keith Milligan became party leader and premier in October 1996.

Nancy Guptill was elected speaker.

There were four sessions of the 59th General Assembly:

Members

Kings

Prince

Queens

Notes:

References
 Election results for the Prince Edward Island Legislative Assembly, 1993-03-29
 Mars-Proietti, Laura Canadian Parliamentary Guide, 2008 

Terms of the General Assembly of Prince Edward Island
1993 establishments in Prince Edward Island
1996 disestablishments in Prince Edward Island